Lucien Magne (27 December 1849 – 25 July 1916) was a French architect specialising in religious buildings.

He took a large part in the completion of the Basilica of the Sacred Heart of Montmartre on the death of Paul Abadie (1884). He created the stained glass museum of the Trocadéro.

References 

1849 births
1916 deaths
Architects from Paris
École des Beaux-Arts alumni
19th-century French architects
French art historians